Page 44 Studios was a video game developer based in San Francisco, California. It was founded in 1998 by General Manager Steven Apour and Director of Development Denis Fung, and named after its original office location at 44 Page Street in San Francisco. Page 44 Studios worked with several video game publishers such as 2D Boy, Disney Interactive Studios, THQ, Electronic Arts, Sony Computer Entertainment, and Activision. In September 2011, the company was acquired by the mobile division of Zynga. At Zynga, Page 44 Studios created the Party Place game for Android/iOS, and a few other prototypes.

Games

External links
Page 44 Studios's profile at MobyGames

Zynga
Defunct video game companies of the United States
Video game companies based in California
Video game companies established in 1998
Video game companies disestablished in 2011
Video game development companies
Defunct companies based in the San Francisco Bay Area
Companies based in San Francisco
1998 establishments in California
2011 disestablishments in California